A magnesium sulfur battery is a rechargeable battery that uses magnesium ion as its charge carrier, magnesium metal as anode and sulfur as cathode. To increase the electronic conductivity of cathode, sulfur is usually mixed with carbon to form a cathode composite. Magnesium sulfur battery is an emerging energy storage technology and now is still in the stage of research. It is of great interest since in theory the Mg/S chemistry can provide 1722 Wh/kg energy density with a voltage at ~1.7 V.

Magnesium is abundant, non-toxic and doesn't degrade in air. Most importantly, magnesium does not form dendrites during deposition/stripping process, which is attributed to be the main cause for the safety issue in lithium ion battery and rechargeable lithium battery. A first review on Mg-S batteries has been published in MRS Communications

Research

Toyota 
In 2011 Toyota Motor announced a research project in this area, and in the same year they reported a new electrolyte that is chemically compatible with sulfur. 
The electrolyte was prepared as a Lewis acid-base complex from the Hauser base (HMDS)MgCl, where HMDS = hexamethyldisilazide, introduced by C. Liebenow et al. in 2000 and AlCl3, conceptionally similar to Aurbach´s binuclear electrolyte complex from 2001.
Although the complex had to be refined by recrystallization and only THF could be used as solvent, a discharge voltage of 1 V was obtained over two cycles, demonstrating the principle feasibility.

Currently, efforts on rechargeable magnesium battery research are known to be underway at Apple, Toyota, and Pellion Technologies, as well as in several universities.

Helmholtz-Institute Ulm and KIT 
In 2013 researchers announced a new electrolyte and accompanying magnesium-based batteries. The electrolyte is more stable and works well with various solvents and at high concentrations. It supports sulfur cathodes. Two commercial chemicals, a magnesium amide and aluminum chloride were mixed in a solvent, the product can then be used directly as an electrolyte.

In 2015 a Mg rechargeable battery was presented built with a graphene–sulfur nanocomposite cathode, a Mg–carbon composite anode and a non-nucleophilic Mg-based complex in tetraglyme solvent as the electrolyte. The graphene–sulfur nanocomposites were prepared with a combination of thermal and chemical precipitation. The Mg/S cell delivers 448 mA h g−1 and 236 mA h g−1 after 50 cycles. The graphene–sulfur composite cathode, with a high surface area, porous morphology and oxygen functional groups, along with a non-nucleophilic Mg electrolyte, gives improved performance.

Recently, a new class of sulfur-compatible and Cl-free electrolytes was introduced. It is based on a weakly coordinated Mg salt with big anions (fluorinated alkoxyborate) which can be prepared by a simple reaction and used in-situ.

University of Maryland 
In 2015, a team at University of Maryland discovered that Li ion additive can enhance the reversibility of the electrochemical reaction in a Mg/S battery. The Mg/S cell delivers ~1000 mAh/g capacity for 30 cycles with two discharge plateau at 1.75V and 1.0V. The obtainable energy density of the cell at material level is 874 Wh/kg, about half of its theoretical value.

In 2017, the same team successfully increases the cycling stability of a Mg/S cell to 110 cycles, by suppressing the dissolution of polysulfide with a concentrated electrolyte, a major reason for the loss of active material and capacity fading in Mg/S batteries. They also demonstrate that the MgTFSI2-MgCl2-DME electrolyte is compatible with sulfur cathode. Unlike the complex electrolytes made through Lewis acid-base reaction or the electrolytes using Mg salts with big anions, this electrolyte can be  simply made by blending dried MgTFSI2, MgCl2 with DME. This facile synthesis procedure enables this electrolyte to be a convenient platform for the community to further study the Mg/S chemistry.

References 

Rechargeable batteries
Magnesium
Sulfur